A list of Spanish chess players:

 
Spanish
Chess players